Vingt à Trente Mille Jours (French for "Twenty to Thirty Thousand Days") is the second album by French singer Françoiz Breut, released in 2000.

Critical reception
Exclaim! wrote that "most songs have a melancholy feel—there's nothing that could be described as upbeat and the majority of them crawl along at a pace slightly faster than that of a snail."

Track listing
Derrière le grand filtre (Philippe Poirier) – 5:52
Si tu disais (Dominique Ané / Dominique Ané – Gaëtan Chataigner – Sacha Toorop – Pierre Bondu) – 2:23
L'Affaire d'un jour (Dominique Ané / Dominique Ané – Gaëtan Chataigner – Sacha Toorop) – 3:43
Portsmouth (Dominique Ané) – 2:56
L'Origine du monde (Philippe Katerine) – 2:46
Vingt à trente mille jours (Dominique Ané / Dominique Ané – Gaëtan Chataigner – Sacha Toorop) – 5:02
La Chanson d'Hélène (Jean-Loup Dabadie/Philippe Sarde) – 3:50
Silhouette minuscule (Jérôme Minière) – 4:13
Sans souci (Peggy Lee/Sonny Burke) – 3:09
La Nuit repose (Dominique Ané / Dominique Ané – Gaëtan Chataigner – Sacha Toorop – Yann Tiersen) – 3:20
L'Heure bleue (Dominique Ané / Dominique Ané – Françoiz Breut – Luc Rambaud – Yann Tiersen – Sacha Toorop) – 4:22
Il n'y a pas d'hommes dans les coulisses (Dominique Ané / Dominique Ané – Gaëtan Chataigner – Yann Tiersen – Françoiz Breut – Sacha Toorop) – 2:34
Le Verre pilé (Dominique Ané / Dominique Ané – Sacha Toorop – Luc Rambo – Yann Tiersen) – 4:37
Je ne veux pas quitter (Dominique Ané / Dominique Ané – Françoiz Breut – Yann Tiersen – Gaëtan Chataigner – Sacha Toorop) – 1:53

Bonus CD, available with first edition only

Intro (?) – 0:20
Departures (Isabelle Casier) – 3:21
Les Bras le long du lit (Dominique Ané / Dominique Ané – Gaëtan Chataigner – Sacha Toorop) – 3:46
The Lease (Sarah Froning / Eric Deleporte) – 3:04
Je ne veux pas m'éloigner (Je ne veux pas quitter II) (Dominique Ané / Dominique Ané – Françoiz Breut – Yann Tiersen – Gaëtan Chataigner – Sacha Toorop) – 3:35

(C) Labels/Virgin France SA 2000 – CD album (7243 8499462 4) + bonus (7243 8499982 7) [19 September 2000]
(C) BELLACD25 – BellaUnion CD – [2001/03/12]

References

2000 albums
Françoiz Breut albums